Lewis House is a historic home located at Cape Vincent in Jefferson County, New York.  It was built about 1875 and is a modest, eclectic -story frame house with an attached -story tower and a 1-story side wing with a shed roof.  The tower is in the Second Empire style with a distinctive mansard roof.

It was listed on the National Register of Historic Places in 1985.

References

Houses on the National Register of Historic Places in New York (state)
Second Empire architecture in New York (state)
Queen Anne architecture in New York (state)
Houses completed in 1875
Houses in Jefferson County, New York
National Register of Historic Places in Jefferson County, New York